Republic of Pińczów may refer to:
 First Republic of Pińczów, established in 1918 during World War I
 Second Republic of Pińczów, established in 1944 during Operation Tempest